Miki Sasaki (内田役子, born 18 July 1971) is a former volleyball player from Japan. She was a member of the Japan women's national team. She participated in the 2003 FIVB World Grand Prix.

Clubs 
 Ito-Yokado (1990-1998) 
 Pioneer Red Wings (1999-2007 · 2008-2009 
 Kenshokai Red Hearts (2009-2010) 
 Hitachi Rivale (2010 -year 2012)

References

1971 births
Living people
Japanese women's volleyball players
Pioneer Red Wings players
Place of birth missing (living people)